was a feudal domain under the Tokugawa shogunate of Edo period Japan, located in Shimōsa Province. It was centered at Yūki castle in what is now part of the city of Yūki, Ibaraki. It was ruled for most of its history by a branch of the Mizuno clan.

History
The Yūki clan was one of the eight leading samurai clans of the Kantō region from the Kamakura period. A younger son of Tokugawa Ieyasu, Hideyasu has been adopted by Toyotomi Hideyoshi as a possible heir, and after the birth of Hideyoshi's son, was sent to become heir to the Yūki clan instead, adopting the name of Yūki Hideyasu. Following the Battle of Sekigahara, he was confirmed as daimyō of Yuki Domain in 1590, ruling until his transfer to Fukui Domain in 1601. The domain reverted to tenryō status, and remained vacant until the Genroku period.

In 1700, Mizuno Katsunaga, daimyo of Nishiya Domain in Noto Province was transferred to the revived Yūki Domain, where his descendants resided until the Meiji Restoration. During the Boshin War, the domain was divided between supporters of the imperial cause, and supporters of the shogunate. The 10th daimyō, Mizuno Katsumoto had been adopted into the clan from Nihonmatsu Domain and was a strong supporter of the Tokugawa, whereas his adopted son and heir, Mizuno Katsuhiro supported the imperial side. Katsumoto assisted Tokugawa partisans capture Yūki castle, but his son assisted in its re-capture by pro-imperial troops. Katsuhiro was punished by the Meiji government with a reduction in revenues of 1000 koku and exile from the domain. Katsuhiro eventually became domain governor and presided over the absorption of the former domain into Ibaraki Prefecture in 1871 after the abolition of the han system.

Holdings at the end of the Edo period
As with most domains in the han system, Yūki Domain consisted of several discontinuous territories calculated to provide the assigned kokudaka, based on periodic cadastral surveys and projected agricultural yields.

Shimōsa Province
13 villages in Yūki District
Kazusa Province 
2 villages in Yamabe District
16 villages in Musha District
Hitachi Province 
1 village in Ibaraki District
12 villages in Makabe District
Shimotsuke Province 
3 villages in Suga District
10 villages in Haka District

List of daimyōs

References

Kodama Kōta 児玉幸多, Kitajima Masamoto 北島正元 (1966). Kantō no shohan 関東の諸藩. Tokyo: Shin Jinbutsu Ōraisha.

External links
 Yūki on "Edo 300 HTML"

Notes

Domains of Japan
1594 establishments in Japan
States and territories established in 1594
1871 disestablishments in Japan
States and territories disestablished in 1871
Shimōsa Province
History of Ibaraki Prefecture